Zhang Yuxuan was the defending champion, but lost in the first round to Shuko Aoyama.

Wang Qiang won the title, defeating Luksika Kumkhum in the final, 7–5, 6–2.

Seeds

Main draw

Finals

Top half

Bottom half

References 
 Main draw

ITF Women's Circuit - Wuhan - Singles
Wuhan World Tennis Tour